Zanjanrud-e Bala Rural District is in the Central District of Zanjan County, Zanjan province, Iran. At the National Census of 2006, its population was 11,912 in 2,922 households. There were 13,532 inhabitants in 3,139 households at the following census of 2011. At the most recent census of 2016, the population of the rural district was 13,572 in 2,951 households. The largest of its 31 villages was the University of Zanjan, with 3,881 people.

References 

Zanjan County

Rural Districts of Zanjan Province

Populated places in Zanjan Province

Populated places in Zanjan County